Parascela is a genus of leaf beetles in the subfamily Eumolpinae. It is distributed in Asia. The genus is placed close to Basilepta. According to Romantsov and Moseyko (2019), however, the differences between Parascela and Basilepta are unclear, and Parascela can probably even be considered a species group within Basilepta.

Species
 Parascela cribrata (Schaufuss, 1871) – Vietnam, China (Fujian, Guangdong, Hong Kong, Jiangxi, Sichuan, Taiwan, Yunnan, Zhejiang), Ryukyu Islands
 Parascela filimonovi Romantsov & Moseyko, 2019 – Northern Vietnam, Southern China (Yunnan)
 Parascela hirsuta (Jacoby, 1908) – Northeast India (Assam), Southern China (Yunnan)
 Parascela rugipennis (Tan, 1988) – Southern China (Yunnan)
 Parascela tuberosa (Jacoby, 1887) – Sri Lanka

Synonyms:
 Parascela tuberosa Tan & Wang, 1983 (preoccupied by P. tuberosa (Jacoby, 1887)): synonym of Parascela rugipennis (Tan, 1988)

References

Eumolpinae
Chrysomelidae genera
Beetles of Asia
Taxa named by Joseph Sugar Baly